3BA (call sign: 3RBA) is a commercial radio station in Ballarat, Victoria, Australia broadcasting on the FM band on a frequency of 102.3 MHz.

Together with its sister station Power FM, it is owned by ARN. The station plays "Great Classics & Today's Favourites", which ranges from the 80s to Today.

3BA moved from AM (1314) to FM (102.3) on 5 May 1998.

Today, 3BA's old 1314 frequency currently relays  RSN 927 whose signal also travels to Ararat, Colac, Hamilton, Stawell and Warrnambool.

In November 2021, 3BA, along with other stations owned by Grant Broadcasters, were acquired by the Australian Radio Network. This deal will allow Grant's stations, including 3BA, to access ARN's iHeartRadio platform in regional areas. The deal was finalized on January 4, 2022. It is expected 3BA will integrate with ARN's Pure Gold Network, but will retain its current name according to the press release from ARN.

On-Air Schedule

Weekdays 
 12:00am–06:00am - Ballarat's 102.3FM 3BA
 06:00am–10:00am - 'The Big Show' with Paul 'PT' Taylor
 10:00am–12:00pm - 'Ballarat Today' with Brett Macdonald
 12:00pm–01:00pm - 'Retro Lunch' with Geordi Norton
 01:00pm–06:00pm - 'Afternoons' with Dave
 06:00pm–08:00pm - 'Sportsday'
 08:00pm–10:00pm - '20-20 Retro Countdown' with Aaron Stevens
 09:00pm–12:00am - Ballarat's 102.3FM 3BA

Saturdays 
 12:00am–06:00am - Ballarat's 102.3FM 3BA
 06:00am–10:00am - Frank Clark (Lifestyle Programs)
 10:00am–12:00pm - 'Off The Bench' with Craig Hutchison & Liam Pickering
 12:00pm–12:00am - Ballarat's 102.3FM 3BA

Sundays 
 12:00am–12:00am - Ballarat's 102.3FM 3BA

Past 3BA announcers
 Garry West
 Glenn McFarlane
 Glenn Driscoll
 Phil Weir
 Mike Cooper
 Dudley Moore
 Randall Smith
 Adrian Lee
 Geoff Nott
 Jim Griffin
 Mike Walden
 Craig Moore
 Stephen Whittaker
 Anthony Kierce
 Craig Meddings
 Tony McManus
 Mal Lewis
 Paul Cook
 Brett Macdonald
 Vaughan Jones
 Tony Dean
 Kathy Bedford
 Leigh Ryan
 Richard Stewart
 Bill Freeman
 John Price
 Tom Bennett
 Rob Hammer
 Rob McCasker
 Ben Rogers
 Ed Cowlishaw
 Craig Blomeley
 Mike Menner
 Peter Grace
 Sean Cullen
 Ralph Bain
 Seb Claassen
 Dan Lonergan
 Gabrielle Hodson
 Garrath Cockerell
 Dean Pickering
 Alex Withers

Program Guide Mon-Fri

References

External links
 Station website

Radio stations in Ballarat
Radio stations established in 1930
Classic hits radio stations in Australia
Australian Radio Network